Cylindrocarpa is a genus  of plants in the Campanulaceae. There is only one known species, Cylindrocarpa sewerzowii, endemic to Kyrgyzstan. It has been found only in the Gory Naryntau mountain range, part of the Tien-Shan chain.

References

External links

Campanuloideae
Flora of Kyrgyzstan
Monotypic Campanulaceae genera